An Episode from the Russian Campaign (French - Épisode de la campagne de Russie) is an 1836 oil on canvas painting by Nicolas-Toussaint Charlet, now in the Musée des Beaux-Arts de Lyon. It shows the retreat from Moscow in 1812 at the end of the French invasion of Russia.

Sources
http://www.mba-lyon.fr/mba/sections/fr/collections-musee/peintures/oeuvres-peintures/xixe_siecle/campagne-de-russie

Works about the French invasion of Russia
War paintings
French paintings
1836 paintings
Paintings in the collection of the Museum of Fine Arts of Lyon